Barra may refer to:

Places
 Barra, Scotland, United Kingdom
 Barra (Naples), Italy
 Barra de Mira, Portugal
 Barra, Gambia
 Barra Beach, Inhambane Province, Mozambique

Brazil
 Barra, Bahia, a municipality in Bahia
 Barra (neighborhood), a neighborhood of the city of Salvador

Organisations
 Barra, Inc., a financial services firm
 Isle of Barra distillery, a whisky distillery

Sport
 Barra brava, a name for organized supporter groups of football teams in Latin America
 Barra Futebol Clube, a Brazilian soccer club
 Barra Mansa Futebol Clube, a Brazilian soccer club

People
 Barra binte Samawal, figure in the life of Muhammad
Caesar B. F. Barra (1880–1949), Italian-American lawyer and politician
 Francisco León de la Barra (1863–1939)
 Joseph Bara (1779–1793), a hero of the French Revolution whose name is often written "Barra"
 Mary Barra (born 1961), CEO of General Motors
 Pasquale Barra (1942–2015), former NCO hitman and pentito
 Ray Barra (born 1930), ballet dancer and ballet director
 Robert Barra (born 1960), New York politician

Other uses
 Barra system, passive solar building technology
 Ford Barra engine, an engine produced by Ford Australia for its Falcon range
 French ship Barra (1794), a 74-gun Ship of the line, captured and served in the Royal Navy as HMS Donegal (1798)
 Storm Barra, a 2021–22 European windstorm

See also
 Barracuda, a fish
 Barramundi, a fish
 Barra, slang term for the British town of Barrow-in-Furness, also as to reflect the local accent
 Burra (disambiguation)
 Barra Bonita (disambiguation), several places
 Barra da Lagoa, a district of the city of Florianópolis in Santa Catarina, Brazil
 Barra da Tijuca, a neighborhood of the city of Rio de Janeiro, Brazil
 Barra de Santo Antônio, a municipality in Alagoas, Brazil
 Barra de São Francisco, a municipality in Espírito Santo, Brazil
 Barra de São Miguel (disambiguation), multiple places
 Barra do Chapéu, a municipality in São Paulo, Brazil 
 Barra do Garças, a city in Mato Grosso, Brazil
 Barra do Piraí, a city in the state of Rio de Janeiro, Brazil
 Barra do Quaraí, a town in Rio Grande do Sul, Brazil
 Barra do Ribeiro, a municipality in the state of Rio Grande do Sul, Brazil
 Barra do Turvo, a municipality in the state of São Paulo, Brazil
 Barra Mansa, a municipality in the state of Rio de Janeiro, Brazil
 Barra de Navidad, Mexico
 Gougane Barra, a settlement in County Cork, Ireland
 Barra Brui, New South Wales, Australia
 Gracie Barra, a Brazilian jiu-jitsu association
 La Barra Brava, an independent supporters' group for Major League Soccer's D.C. United and the United States